Víctor Matías Rosa Castro (born 10 January 1982) is a Uruguayan football manager and former player who played as a midfielder. He is the current manager of Peruvian club Cantolao.

Playing career
Born in Tacuarembó, Rosa made his senior debut with hometown side Tacuarembó FC in 2000. In 2004, he moved to Liverpool Montevideo, playing for three seasons with the side. 

After spending the 2007 season at Durazno, Rosa subsequently returned to Tacuarembó. He then moved abroad with Sacachispas and Deportivo Malacateco in Guatemala, and retired with the latter in 2011, aged just 29.

Managerial career
After working in the youth sides of Miramar Misiones and Montevideo Wanderers, Rosa was Gustavo Ferrín's assistant at Cerro in 2016. In August of that year, he replaced Elio Rodríguez at the helm of Canadian.

In 2017, after a short period in charge of Huracán Buceo, Rosa joined Plaza Colonia as manager of the youth setup. On 28 March 2019, after the dismissal of Mario Szlafmyc, he was named interim manager of the first team, being confirmed in charge on 2 April.

On 30 January 2021, Rosa left Plaza Colonia on a mutual consent. He returned to Tacuarembó on 25 February, now as manager; on 14 December, after failing to achieve promotion from the Primera División Amateur, he left.

On 15 December 2021, Rosa moved to Ecuador after being named at the helm of Guayaquil Sport, with the club being renamed Búhos ULVR shortly after. On 5 December of the following year, he switched teams and countries again after being appointed in charge of Cantolao in Peru.

References

External links
  
 
 

1992 births
Living people
Uruguayan footballers
Association football midfielders
Tacuarembó F.C. players
Liverpool F.C. (Montevideo) players
Sacachispas Fútbol Club players
C.D. Malacateco players
Uruguayan expatriate footballers
Uruguayan expatriate sportspeople in Guatemala
Expatriate footballers in Guatemala
Uruguayan football managers
Club Plaza Colonia de Deportes managers
Tacuarembó F.C. managers
Academia Deportiva Cantolao managers
Uruguayan expatriate football managers
Uruguayan expatriate sportspeople in Ecuador
Uruguayan expatriate sportspeople in Peru
Expatriate football managers in Ecuador
Expatriate football managers in Peru